An election was held on November 3, 2020 to elect all 120 members to North Carolina's House of Representatives. The election coincided with the elections for other offices, including the Presidency, U.S Senate, Governor, U.S. House of Representatives, and state senate. The primary election was held on March 3, 2020 with a run-off on June 23, 2020.

Background
In October 2020, The Washington Post identified this state election, along with the concurrent North Carolina Senate election, as one of eight whose outcomes could affect partisan balance during post-census redistricting. New districts are being used in this election.

Predictions

Results summary

Statewide

Close races
Districts where the margin of victory was under 10%:

Incumbents defeated in primary election
Elmer Floyd (D-District 43), defeated by Kimberly Hardy (D)

Incumbents defeated in general election
Perrin Jones (R-District 9), defeated by Brian Farkas (D)
Sydney Batch (D-District 37), defeated by Erin Pare (R)
Stephen Ross (R-District 63), defeated by Ricky Hurtado (D)
Scott Brewer (D-District 66), defeated by Ben Moss (R)
Carl Ray Russell (D-District 93), defeated by Ray Pickett (R)
Christy Clark (D-District 98), defeated by John Bradford (R)
Joe Sam Queen (D-District 119), defeated by Mike Clampitt (R)

Open seats that changed parties
Elmer Floyd (D-District 43) lost re-nomination, seat won by Diane Wheatley (R)

Newly created seats
District 19, won by Charlie Miller (R)

Detailed results

Districts 1-19

District 1
Incumbent Republican Ed Goodwin has represented the 1st District since 2019.

District 2
Incumbent Republican Larry Yarborough has represented the 2nd district since 2015.

District 3
Incumbent Republican Michael Speciale has represented the 3rd district since 2013.  Speciale didn't seek re-election and fellow Republican Steve Tyson won the open seat.

District 4
Incumbent Republican Jimmy Dixon has represented the 4th district since 2011.

District 5
Incumbent Democratic Howard Hunter III has represented the 5th district since 2015.

District 6
Incumbent Republican Bobby Hanig has represented the 6th district since 2019.

District 7
Incumbent Republican Lisa Stone Barnes has represented the 7th district since 2019.  Barnes sought election to the North Carolina Senate. Republican Matthew Winslow won the open seat.

District 8
Incumbent Democrat Kandie Smith has represented the 8th district since 2019. 
Former state senator Tony Moore unsuccessfully challenged Smith.

District 9
Incumbent Republican Perrin Jones has represented the 9th district since October 2019. Jones sought election to a full term, but he was defeated by 2016 Democratic nominee Brian Farkas.

District 10
Incumbent Republican Majority Leader John Bell has represented the 10th district since 2013.

District 11
Incumbent Democrat Allison Dahle has represented the 11th district since 2019.

District 12
Incumbent Republican Chris Humphrey has represented the 12th district since 2019.

District 13
Incumbent Republican Pat McElraft has represented the 13th district since 2007.

District 14
Incumbent Republican George Cleveland has represented the 14th district since 2005.

District 15
Incumbent Republican Phil Shepard has represented the 15th district since 2011.

District 16
Incumbent Republican Carson Smith has represented the 16th district since 2019.

District 17
Incumbent Republican Frank Iler has represented the 17th district since 2009.

District 18
Incumbent Democrat Deb Butler has represented the 18th district since 2017.

District 19
The new 19th district contains parts of Brunswick and New Hanover counties and had no incumbent. Republican Charlie Miller won the open seat.

Districts 20-39

District 20
Incumbent Republican Holly Grange has represented the 20th district since 2016.  Grange ran unsuccessfully Governor of North Carolina in the 2020 election, losing the Republican primary to Dan Forest.   Republican Ted Davis Jr., who has represented the 19th district since 2012, successfully sought re-election.

District 21
Incumbent Democrat Raymond Smith has represented the 21st district since 2019.

District 22
Incumbent Republican William Brisson has represented the 22nd district since 2007.

District 23
Incumbent Democrat Shelly Willingham has represented the 23rd district since 2015.

District 24
Incumbent Democrat Linda Cooper-Suggs has represented the 24th district since her appointment in July 2020. Copper-Suggs was elected to a full term.

District 25
Incumbent Democrat James Gailliard has represented the 25th district since 2019.

District 26
Incumbent Republican Donna McDowell White has represented the 26th district since 2017.

District 27
Incumbent Democrat Michael Wray has represented the 27th district since 2005.

District 28
Incumbent Republican Larry Strickland has represented the 28th district since 2017.

District 29
Incumbent Democrat Vernetta Alston has represented the 29th district since 2020.  Alston was elected to a full term unopposed.

District 30
Incumbent Democrat Marcia Morey has represented the 30th district since 2017.

District 31
Incumbent Democrat Zack Forde-Hawkins has represented the 31st district since 2019.  Forde-Hawkins defeated frequent Libertarian candidate Sean Haugh in the general election.

District 32
Incumbent Democrat Terry Garrison has represented the 32nd district since 2017.

District 33
Incumbent Democrat Rosa Gill has represented the 33rd district since 2009.

District 34
Incumbent Democrat Grier Martin has represented the 34th district since 2013.

District 35
Incumbent Democrat Terence Everitt has represented the 35th district since 2019.

District 36
Incumbent Democrat Julie von Haefen has represented the 36th district since 2019.

District 37
Incumbent Democrat Sydney Batch has represented the 37th district since 2019.

District 38
Incumbent Democrat Yvonne Lewis Holley has represented the 38th district since 2013.  Holley ran unsuccessfully for Lieutenant Governor in the 2020 election, thus she didn't seek re-election. Democrat Abe Jones won the open seat.

District 39
Incumbent Democratic Minority Leader Darren Jackson has represented the 39th district since 2009.   Jackson will be unopposed for re-election

Districts 40-59

District 40
Incumbent Democrat Joe John has represented the 40th district since 2017.

District 41
Incumbent Democrat Gale Adcock has represented the 41st district since 2015.

District 42
Incumbent Democrat Marvin Lucas has represented the 42nd district since 2001.

District 43
Incumbent Democrat Elmer Floyd has represented the 43rd district since 2009. Floyd lost re-nomination to Kimberly Hardy. Republican Diane Wheatley defeated Hardy in the general election.

District 44
Incumbent Democrat William "Billy" Richardson has represented the 44th district since 2015.

District 45
Incumbent Republican John Szoka has represented the 45th district since 2013.

District 46
Incumbent Republican Brenden Jones has represented the 46th district since 2017.

District 47
Incumbent Democrat Charles Graham has represented the 47th district since 2011.

District 48
Incumbent Democrat Garland Pierce has represented the 48th district since 2005.

District 49
Incumbent Democrat Cynthia Ball has represented the 49th district since 2017.

District 50
Incumbent Democrat Graig Meyer has represented the 50th district since 2013.  Meyer is running for re-election unopposed.

District 51
Incumbent Republican John Sauls has represented the 51st district since 2017.

District 52
Incumbent Republican Jamie Boles has represented the 52nd district since 2009.

District 53
Incumbent Republican Howard Penny Jr. has represented the 53rd district since his appointment on September 17, 2020.  Penny was elected to his first full term.

District 54
Incumbent Democrat Robert Reives II has represented the 54th district since 2014.

District 55
Incumbent Republican Mark Brody has represented the 55th district since 2013.

District 56
Incumbent Democrat Verla Insko has represented the 56th district since 1997.  Insko is seeking re-election unopposed.

District 57
Incumbent Democrat Ashton Clemmons has represented the 57th district since 2019.

District 58
Incumbent Democrat Amos Quick has represented the 58th district since 2017.

District 59
Incumbent Republican Jon Hardister has represented the 59th district since 2013.

Districts 60-79

District 60
Incumbent Democrat Cecil Brockman has represented the 60th district since 2015.

District 61
Incumbent Democrat Pricey Harrison has represented the 61st district and its predecessors since 2005.  Harrison is seeking re-election unopposed.

District 62
Incumbent Republican John Faircloth has represented the 62nd district and its predecessors since 2011.

District 63
Incumbent Republican Stephen Ross has represented the 63rd District since 2013.  Ross lost re-election to Democrat Ricky Hurtado.

District 64
Incumbent Republican Dennis Riddell has represented the 64th District since 2013.

District 65
Incumbent Republican Jerry Carter has represented the 65th district since 2019.

District 66
Incumbent Democrat Scott Brewer has represented the 66th District since his appointment in May 2019.  Brewer sought election to a full term in office, but he was defeated by Republican Ben Moss.

District 67
Incumbent Wayne Sasser has represented the 67th District since 2019.   Sasser is unopposed for re-election.

District 68
Incumbent Republican Craig Horn has represented the 68th District since 2011.  Horn ran unsuccessfully NC Superintendent of Public Instruction, losing the Republican nomination to Catherine Truitt. Republican David Willis won the open seat.

District 69
Incumbent Republican Dean Arp has represented the 69th District since 2013.

District 70
Incumbent Republican Pat Hurley has represented the 70th District since 2007.

District 71
Incumbent Democrat Evelyn Terry has represented the 71st District since 2013.  Terry is seeking re-election unopposed.

District 72
Incumbent Democrat Derwin Montgomery has represented the 72nd District since 2018.  Montgomery sought election to the U.S House of Representatives, losing the Democratic nomination for the 6th district to Kathy Manning. Democrat Amber Baker won the open seat.

District 73
Incumbent Republican Lee Zachary has represented the 73rd District since 2015.

District 74
Incumbent Republican Wes Schollander has represented the 74th District since his appointment on August 19, 2020.   Schollander didn't seek re-election and Republican Jeff Zenger won the open seat.

District 75
Incumbent Republican Donny Lambeth has represented the 75th District since 2013.

District 76
Incumbent Republican Harry Warren has represented the 76th district and its predecessors since 2011.

District 77 
Incumbent Republican Julia Craven Howard has represented the 79th district and its predecessors since 1989.

District 78
Incumbent Republican Allen McNeill has represented the 78th District since 2012.  McNeill is unopposed for re-election.

District 79
Incumbent Republican Keith Kidwell has represented the 79th district since 2019.

Districts 80-99

District 80
Incumbent Republican Steve Jarvis has represented the 80th District since 2019. Jarvis successfully sought election to the North Carolina Senate.  Former representative Sam Watford won the open seat.

District 81
Incumbent Republican Larry Potts has represented the 81st District since 2017.

District 82
Incumbent Republican Kristin Baker has represented the 82nd district since her appointment in March 2020.  Baker was elected to a full term.

District 83
Incumbent Republican Larry Pittman has represented the 83rd district and its predecessors since 2011.

District 84
Incumbent Republican Jeffrey McNeely has represented the 84th District since his appointment on July 5, 2019.  McNeely was elected to a full term.

District 85
Incumbent Republican Josh Dobson has represented the 85th District since 2013.  Dobson successfully sought election to become the NC Commissioner of Labor. Republican Dudley Greene won the open seat.

District 86
Incumbent Republican Hugh Blackwell has represented the 86th District since 2009.

District 87
Incumbent Republican Destin Hall has represented the 87th District since 2017.

District 88
Incumbent Democrat Mary Belk has represented the 88th District since 2017.

District 89
Incumbent Republican Mitchell Setzer has represented the 89th District and its predecessors since 1999.

District 90
Incumbent Republican Sarah Stevens has represented the 90th District since 2009.

District 91
Incumbent Republican Kyle Hall has represented the 91st District since 2015.

District 92
Incumbent Democrat Chaz Beasley has represented the 92nd District since 2017.  Beasley ran unsuccessfully for Lieutenant Governor of North Carolina in the 2020 election, losing the Democratic nomination to Yvonne Lewis Holley. Democrat Terry Brown won the open seat.

District 93
Incumbent Democrat Carl Ray Russell has represented the 93rd district since 2019. Russell lost re-election to Republican Ray Pickett.

District 94
Incumbent Republican Jeffrey Elmore has represented the 94th District since 2013.

District 95
Incumbent Republican John Fraley has represented the 95th District since 2015.  Fraley didn't seek re-election and former Republican representative Grey Mills won the open seat.

District 96
Incumbent Republican Jay Adams has represented the 96th District since 2015.

District 97
Incumbent Republican Jason Saine has represented the 97th District since 2011.

District 98
Incumbent Democrat Christy Clark has represented the 98th district since 2019. Republican John Bradford defeated Clark in a rematch of the 2018 election.

District 99
Incumbent Democrat Nasif Majeed has represented the 99th District since 2019.

Districts 100-120

District 100
Incumbent Democrat John Autry has represented the 100th District since 2017.

District 101
Incumbent Democrat Carolyn Logan has represented the 101st District since 2019.

District 102
Incumbent Democrat Becky Carney has represented the 102nd District since 2003.

District 103
Incumbent Democrat Rachel Hunt has represented the 103rd District since 2019.  Republican Bill Brawley ran unsuccessfully for the 103rd district again, after losing to Hunt in the 2018 election.

District 104
Incumbent Democrat Brandon Lofton has represented the 104th District since 2019.

District 105
Incumbent Democrat Wesley Harris has represented the 105th District since 2019.

District 106
Incumbent Democrat Carla Cunningham has represented the 106th District since 2013.  Cunningham is seeking re-election unopposed.

District 107
Incumbent Democrat Kelly Alexander has represented the 107th District since 2009.

District 108
Incumbent Republican John Torbett has represented the 108th District since 2011.

District 109
Incumbent Republican Dana Bumgardner has represented the 109th District since 2013.

District 110
Incumbent Republican Kelly Hastings has represented the 110th District since 2011.

District 111
Incumbent Republican Speaker of the House Tim Moore has represented the 111th District since 2003.

District 112
Incumbent Republican David Rogers has represented the 112th District since 2016.

District 113
Incumbent Republican Jake Johnson has represented the 113th District since his appointment on August 6, 2019.  Johnson is seeking his first full term in office.

District 114
Incumbent Democrat Susan Fisher has represented the 114th District since 2004.

District 115
Incumbent Democrat John Ager has represented the 115th District since 2015.

District 116
Incumbent Democrat Brian Turner has represented the 116th District since 2015.

District 117
Incumbent Republican Chuck McGrady had represented the 117th District since 2011.   McGrady resigned before the end of his term and former 116th district representative Tim Moffitt was appointed to finish his term. Moffitt was elected to a full term.

District 118
Incumbent Republican Michele Presnell has represented the 118th District since 2013.  Presnell didn't seek re-election and fellow Republican Mark Pless won the open seat.

District 119
Incumbent Democrat Joe Sam Queen has represented the 119th District since 2019 and previously from 2013 to 2017.   Queen lost re-election to former representative Mike Clampitt.

District 120
Incumbent Republican Kevin Corbin has represented the 120th District since 2017.  Corbin sought election to the 50th district in the North Carolina Senate. Fellow Republican Karl Gillespie won the open seat.

See also
 2020 North Carolina elections

References

Further reading
 . (About redistricting).

External links
 . (Lawsuit about electronic voting system, "ExpressVote", a product of Election Systems & Software, LLC)

 
 
 
  (State affiliate of the U.S. League of Women Voters)
 

North Carolina House of Representatives
House of Representatives
2020